Zoroastre (Zoroaster) is an opera by Jean-Philippe Rameau, first performed on 5 December 1749 by the Opéra in the first Salle du Palais-Royal in Paris. The libretto is by Louis de Cahusac. Zoroastre was the fourth of Rameau's tragédies en musique to be staged and the last to appear during the composer's own lifetime. Audiences gave the original version a lukewarm reception, so Rameau and his librettist thoroughly reworked the opera for a revival which took place at the Opéra on 19 January 1756. This time the work was a great success and this is the version generally heard today.

Performance history
Zoroastre'''s premiere in 1749 was not a success; despite the magnificence of the staging, it failed to compete with Mondonville's new opéra-ballet Le carnaval du Parnasse. Rameau and Cahusac decided to rework the opera completely before offering it to the public again in 1756. Acts 2,3 and 5 were heavily rewritten and there were several modifications to the plot. This time audiences took to the opera, although the critic Melchior Grimm was withering about Cahusac's libretto: "In Zoroastre it is day and night alternately; but as the poet...cannot count up to five he has got so muddled in his reckoning that he has been compelled to make it be day and night two or three times in each act, so that it might be day at the end of the play". Zoroastre was chosen to open the new Paris opera house on January 26, 1770, the old one having burned down in 1763. It was also translated into Italian by Casanova for a performance in Dresden in 1752, although some of Rameau's music was replaced by that of the ballet master Adam. Its first modern revival was in a concert version at the Schola Cantorum, Paris in 1903. The United States premiere of the opera was staged by Boston Baroque (then known as Banchetto Musicale) at Harvard University's Sanders Theater under conductor Martin Pearlman in 1983 with Jean-Claude Orliac in the title role and James Maddalena as Abramane.

Libretto and musicZoroastre includes some important innovations: it was the first major French opera to dispense with an allegorical prologue and its subject matter is not drawn from the Classical mythology of Greece and Rome, as was usual, but from Persian religion. There was good reason for this. As Graham Sadler writes, the opera is "a thinly disguised portrayal of Freemasonry". Cahusac, the librettist, was a leading French Mason and many of his works celebrate the ideals of the Enlightenment, including Zoroastre. The historical Zoroaster was highly regarded in Masonic circles and the parallels are obvious between Rameau's opera and an even more famous Masonic allegory, Mozart's The Magic Flute (1791), with its initiation rites conducted under the auspices of the wise "Sarastro".

Roles

SynopsisThe synopsis is based on the 1756 version Act 1 
The story takes place in the ancient kingdom of Bactria and concerns the struggle between the forces of Good, led by Zoroastre, the "founder of the Magi", and Evil, led by the sorcerer Abramane. When the opera opens, Bactria is in chaos after the death of its king, who has left behind two daughters: Amélite, the presumptive heir, and Erinice. Both are in love with Zoroastre, who is devoted to Amélite. Abramane has taken the opportunity to send Zoroastre into exile. The sorcerer also plots to seize the throne with Erinice, who wants revenge on Zoroastre for rejecting her love. Abramane conjures up demons to capture Amélite.

Act 2
Zoroastre is in exile at the palace of the king of the good genies, Oromasès. Oromasès tells Zoroastre to go and rescue Amélite and destroy the forces of evil. He puts Zoroastre through a magic initiation ritual to prepare him for the task. In the dungeons of the fortress of Bactria, Abramane and Erinice are torturing Amélite to force her to renounce the throne, when Zoroastre suddenly appears. He releases Amélite and destroys the fortress with his magic powers. Amélite is presented as queen to her joyful Bactrian subjects.

Act 3
Night. Abramane and Erinice quarrel over the disaster that has befallen their plans. Abramane hides Erinice in a cloud. At dawn, Zoroastre, Amélite and the Bactrian people assemble to worship the Supreme Being then celebrate the marriage of Zoroastre and Amélite. As the wedding ceremony takes place, Abramane arrives on a fiery chariot and kidnaps Amélite. Zoroastre prepares his magic spirits for war.

Act 4
In the temple of the god Arimane, Abramane receives news that the battle between the spirits of good and evil is going badly for him. He sacrifices to the god and summons up Hate, Vengeance and Despair.

Act 5
Erinice, now repentant, warns Zoroastre of Abramane's plan for a new battle. Abramane appears in the fiery chariot once more and reveals Amélite in chains. He calls on Zoroastre to surrender. Instead, Zoroastre calls on the gods, who strike down Abramane and his evil priests with thunderbolts. The opera ends with rejoicing as Zoroastre and Amélite are crowned king and queen of Bactria.

 Discography 

References
Notes

Sources
Girdlestone, Cuthbert, Jean-Philippe Rameau: His Life and Work, New York: Dover, 1969 (paperback edition)
Holden, Amanda (ed.), The New Penguin Opera Guide, New York: Penguin Putnam, 2001. 
Sadler, Graham, (ed.), The New Grove French Baroque Masters'', Grove/Macmillan, 1988
Sadler, Graham, Booklet notes to the 2002 Christie recording

External links

Operas
Operas by Jean-Philippe Rameau
Operas set in the Middle East
Operas based on real people
French-language operas
Tragédies en musique
1749 operas
Opera world premieres at the Paris Opera
Cultural depictions of Zoroaster